Al-Muntafiq was a large Arab tribal confederation of southern Iraq and Kuwait. The confederation's tribes predominantly settled in Iraq's southern provinces and northern Kuwait. The confederation is not homogeneous in terms of sect/religion. Centuries of intermarriage and intermingling created mixed of Sunni and Shia tribes. Therefore, a minority of individual tribes within the confederation is Sunni. Overall, it is almost impossible to delineate who is, and who is not part of the Muntafiq.

The tribe is divided into three main branches: Bani Malik, al-Ajwad, and Bani Sa'id. Most of the tribe traces its genealogy to the tribe of Banu 'Uqayl of the large and ancient Banu 'Amir confederation of Najd. However, the tribe's traditional leaders are Al-Saadun ("the house of Saadun"), who are said to be Sharifs originating from Mecca, while the al-Ajwad branch is said to partially originate from the ancient Arab tribe of Tayy. The Muntafiq tribe was led by Yusuf Beg of the Saadun clan.  They were traditional rivals of the Dhufir and of Ibn Saud, although Yusuf sometimes co-operated with Ibn Saud.

The tribe migrated to Iraq during the Islamic conquests. In Ottoman times, the tribe held control over the region of Basrah under Ottoman suzerainty. In 1521, they successfully occupied al-Ahsa and al-Qatif (eastern Saudi Arabia today) on the Ottomans' behalf, before being expelled by Banu Khalid. 

During the Ottoman era, most of the tribe settled into sedentary life and took up agriculture in southern and western Iraq. During the Ottoman era, from the late eighteenth century onwards, al-Muntafiq converted to Shia Islam.

The city of Nasiriya in southern Iraq was named after one of the tribe's sheikhs, and the surrounding province was known as "Al-Muntafiq Province" until 1976.

Those who were herders of small animals such as sheep and goat, rather than camels, and this made them less mobile and less competent as a fighting force compared to the camel-herding tribes of inner Arabia.

Although the tribe's nominal leaders, the Al Saadun, are Sunnis, most of the tribe's members follow the Shi'ite sect of Islam. After many decades of sedentarization, the tribal bond has weakened and the leadership of the Al Saadun is largely nominal.

Many stateless Bedoon in Kuwait belong to the Muntafiq tribal confederation.

Division
 Bani Malik:
 Al Ibrahim
 Al Wadai
 Al Majid
 Al Diwan
 Al Taughiyah

 Al Ajwad :
 Al Bdour
 Al Juwarin
 Al Ghazzi
 Al Shuraifat

 Bani Huchaim:
 Al Zayyad
 Al Ghazalat
 Bani Salamah

 Albu Salah:
 Al Shamlah
 Al Safaa
 Al Abada
 Al Araithib

 Albu Salah:
 Al Aunan
 Al Rufiat
 Al Zuaba

See also
 Bedoon

Sources
 Levi Della Vida, G.; Sluglett, P. "al- Muntafiḳ ." Encyclopaedia of Islam. Edited by: P. Bearman, Th. Bianquis, C.E. Bosworth, E. van Donzel and W.P. Heinrichs. Brill, 2007. Brill Online.  Christiane Thompson, Iranian Tentacles into Iraq, 2009

Notes

Tribes of Arabia
Tribes of Iraq
Tribes of Kuwait
Banu Uqayl
History of Kuwait